Alexandra Milton (born 4 June 1967 in Paris) is an artist and illustrator. She works primarily in collage.

The artwork in her debut children's book, Call Me Gorgeous, was nominated for the 2010 Kate Greenaway Medal.

The book was also a 2009 Book Start choice, distributed free to 100,000 children across the UK. In 2012, it was selected as one of the featured titles in the Book Trust's new Book Buzz programme.

Alexandra Milton is married to the writer and historian, Giles Milton, who wrote the text for Call Me Gorgeous and Good Luck Baby Owls.

Personal life

She is the daughter of the German artist Wolfram Aichele and the granddaughter of Erwin Aichele. Her brother is Benedikt Aichele.

Milton studied fine art at the Academie Charpentier in Paris.

Commissioned and Published Works

 Call Me Gorgeous (UK hardback) 2009 Boxer Books: 
 Call Me Gorgeous (USA hardback) 2009: 
 Good Luck Baby Owls Boxer Books, 2012.
 Who Is In The Egg? Boxer Books, 2020

Call Me Gorgeous

Call Me Gorgeous was Alexandra Milton's debut children's title. The book's artwork received widespread critical acclaimand was nominated for the 2010 Kate Greenaway Medal. The book was selected for the 2009 Book Start programme.

The story of Call Me Gorgeous draws its inspiration from the culinary texts of the court of King Henry VIII; these record that chimerical monsters were stitched together from various animal parts and served to the king and his courtiers on feast days.

References

External links 
 The official website of Alexandra Milton

Living people
1967 births
Collage artists
Women collage artists
French illustrators
French women illustrators